Ohio's 19th senatorial district is based in north-central Ohio, and currently consists of Delaware and Knox counties as well as a portion of Franklin county. It encompasses Ohio House districts 22, 67 and 68.  It has a Cook PVI of R+6.  The district was represented by the Senate President from 2005 to 2010 with Senator Bill Harris.  Its current Ohio Senator is Republican Andrew Brenner.  He resides in Powell, a city located in Delaware County.

List of senators

References

External links
Ohio's 19th district senator at the 130th Ohio General Assembly official website

Ohio State Senate districts